In enzymology, a petromyzonol sulfotransferase is an enzyme that catalyzes the chemical reaction

3'-phosphoadenylyl sulfate + 5alpha-cholan-3alpha,7alpha,12alpha,24-tetrol  adenosine 3',5'-bisphosphate + 5alpha-cholan-3alpha,7alpha,12alpha-triol 24-sulfate

Thus, the two substrates of this enzyme are 3'-phosphoadenylyl sulfate and 5alpha-cholan-3alpha,7alpha,12alpha,24-tetrol, whereas its two products are adenosine 3',5'-bisphosphate and 5alpha-cholan-3alpha,7alpha,12alpha-triol 24-sulfate.

This enzyme belongs to the family of transferases, specifically the sulfotransferases, which transfer sulfur-containing groups.  The systematic name of this enzyme class is 3'-phosphoadenylyl-sulfate:5alpha-cholan-3alpha,7alpha,12alpha,24-te trol sulfotransferase. This enzyme is also called PZ-SULT.

References

 

EC 2.8.2
Enzymes of unknown structure